Ryan Bishops is a Canadian rock and country guitarist and songwriter from Sudbury, Ontario, who plays as a supporting musician in Ox and in singer-songwriter Kate Maki's backing band.

In 2005, Bishops was also a headlining artist along with Maki, Nathan Lawr, Ruth Minnikin and Dale Murray in two national concert tours, A Midautumn Night's Dream and A Midwinter Night's Dream, which were reportedly inspired by Bob Dylan's Rolling Thunder Revue. The five musicians also recorded limited edition albums for sale on each tour.

References

External links
 Ryan Bishops

Canadian country guitarists
Canadian male guitarists
Canadian rock guitarists
Canadian songwriters
Franco-Ontarian people
Living people
Musicians from Greater Sudbury
Writers from Greater Sudbury
Year of birth missing (living people)